Argol may refer to:

 Argol, Finistère, a commune on the Crozon peninsula in Finistère, Brittany, France
 Arghul, a woodwind musical instrument from the Middle East
 Potassium tartrate
 A character in the French comic book Welcome to Alflolol

See also
 The Castle of Argol, a 1938 novel of Julien Gracq